Advance Developing Markets is a large British investment trust dedicated to investments in emerging markets. Established in 1998, the company was a constituent of the FTSE 250 Index until September 2008. The Chairman is Peter O'Connor.

References
  Official site

Investment trusts of the United Kingdom